Diacylglycerol O-acyltransferase 1 is an enzyme that in humans is encoded by the DGAT1 gene.

Function

This gene encodes a multipass transmembrane protein that functions as a key metabolic enzyme. The encoded protein catalyzes the conversion of diacylglycerol and fatty acyl CoA to triacylglycerol. This enzyme can also transfer acyl CoA to retinol. Activity of this protein may be associated with obesity and other metabolic diseases.
 This enzyme is essential for lactation in mice, and mutations in this gene affect the composition and volume of milk produced by both cattle and goats.
Without this gene activity, infants who have a mutation in this gene are incapable of breaking down fat. This lack of capability to break down fat causes diarrhea and vomiting which eventually causes FTT (Failure to Thrive) and need of TPN (Total Parenteral Nutrition) if not given correct formula. Further this will cause protein losing enteropathy and very low albumin.

See also 
 Diglyceride acyltransferase

References

Further reading 

 

EC 2.3.1